Longtan Township is an rural township in Zhuzhou County, Zhuzhou City, Hunan Province, People's Republic of China.

Cityscape
The township is divided into 11 villages, the following areas: Xinbaqiao Village, Shaohua Village, Xintian Village, Taishuichong Village, Leyun Village, Shuiyuan Village, Longtan Village, Xinyan Village, Ziyun Village, Tonggu Village, and Taihua Village.

References

External links

Divisions of Zhuzhou County